Antonio Campbell (born December 24, 1994) is an American basketball player for Al Nassr Riyadh of the Saudi Premier League. He played college basketball for the Ohio Bobcats.

College career 
As a freshman Campbell averaged 3.8 points, 2.6 rebounds, and 9.6 minutes per game for Ohio.

In his sophomore season Campbell averaged 10.0 points, 7.6 rebounds and 24.1 minutes per game.

In his junior season, Campbell averaged 17.5 points and 10.0 rebounds per game. He was named MAC Player of the Year in 2016, receiving 18 first place votes. Despite flirting with the 2016 NBA Draft, Campbell ultimately decided to return to school after not receiving a combine invite. He missed most of his senior season with a broken foot.

Professional career 
After going undrafted in the 2017 NBA draft, Campbell signed with the Lakeland Magic of the NBA G League on January 24, 2018, playing in 20 games and averaging 6.3 points, 4.6 rebounds and 0.7 blocks in 15.9 minutes.

On April 5, 2018, after the conclusion of the G League season, Campbell signed with the Alaska Aces of the Philippine Basketball Association. In 10 games with the Aces, Campbell averaged 22.6 points per game, 14.8 rebounds per game and 1.5 blocks per game, helping the Aces to clinch the 2nd place for the playoffs. But before the last game of the Aces, he was replaced with another import Diamon Simpson

Campbell signed with the Turkish team Pınar Karşıyaka on August 6, 2018. 

On October 23, 2018, Campbell was included in the training camp roster of the Lakeland Magic.

On May 20, 2019, he signed with the Hefei Yuanchaung of the NBL-China. He scored a career-high 54 points (including a career-high 9 3-pointers) and grabbed 17 rebounds in a 125–146 loss to the Henan Golden Elephants.

On October 22, 2019, he signed with Sigortam.net İTÜ BB of the Basketball Super League. Campbell tested positive for a banned substance on March 27, 2020, and on May 15, he was issued a fine and suspended for 18 months by the Turkish Basketball Federation.

For the 2020–21 season, Campbell rejoined the Lakeland Magic where he played 7 games.

On August 25, 2021, Campbell signed with Prometey Kamianske of the Ukrainian Basketball SuperLeague. In three games, he averaged 4.7 points, 5.3 rebounds, and 1.0 block per game. On October 2, Campbell signed with Astana of the Kazakhstan Championship.

Career statistics

International

|-
| align=center | 2018
| align=left | Alaska
| PBA
| 10 || 31.69 || .450 || .380 || .750 || 14.8 || 2.0 || 1.20 || 1.50 || 22.6

References 

1994 births
Living people
Alaska Aces (PBA) players
American expatriate basketball people in China
American expatriate basketball people in the Philippines
American expatriate basketball people in Turkey
American expatriate basketball people in Ukraine
American men's basketball players
Basketball players from Cincinnati
Doping cases in basketball
İstanbul Teknik Üniversitesi B.K. players
Karşıyaka basketball players
Lakeland Magic players
Ohio Bobcats men's basketball players
Philippine Basketball Association imports
Power forwards (basketball)
Al Nassr BC players